Garisheh or Gerisheh may refer to:
 Garisheh, Hormozgan
 Gerisheh, Kermanshah
 Garisheh, Sistan and Baluchestan